Norman Henry Giles (August 6, 1915 – October 16, 2006) was an American microbial geneticist who studied mutations of Neurospora crassa.

Norman H. Giles was a pioneer in genetics research.  He was a member of the Botany Department at Yale University starting as an Instructor in Botany and rising to Professor of Biology (1951-1961). He then became Professor of Genetics (1961-1972).  In 1972 Giles accepted a professorship at the University of Georgia where he established an active program in genetics that in 1980 became the Department of Genetics. He retired in 1986.  Giles made important scientific contributions in the areas of intragenic complementation, gene conversion and analysis of gene clusters.  His early work on intragenic complementation led to the insight that complemetation between allelic mutants is of widespread occurrence and likely involves interactions occurring in the cytoplasm between defective gene products, that is between polypeptides.  This early insight led to numerous further studies of intragenic complementation that amplified this initial insight (see for example).

Notable papers
 1940: "The effects of fast neutrons on the chromosomes of  Tradescantia". Proc. Natl. Acad. Sci. U. S. A. 26:567-575.
 1948: With E. Z. Lederberg, "Induced reversions of biochemical mutants in Neurospora crassa". Am. J. Bot. 35:150-157.
 1950: With H. P. Riley, "Studies on the mechanism of oxygen effect on the radiosensitivity of  Tradescantia chromosomes". Proc. Natl. Acad. Sci. U. S. A. 36:337-344.
 1950: With A. V. Beatty, "The effect of x-irradiation in oxygen and in hydrogen at normal and positive pressures on chromosome aberration frequency in Tradescantia microspores". Science 112:643-645.
 1951: "Studies on the mechanism of reversion in biochemical mutants of Neurospora crassa". Cold Spring Harb. Sym. 16:283-313.
 1956: "Forward and back mutation at specific loci in Neurospora". Brookhaven Sym. Biol. 8:103-125.
 1957: With  C. W.  H. Partridge and  N.  J.  Nelson, "The genetic control of adenylosuccinase in Neurospora crassa". Proc. Natl. Acad. Sci. U. S. A. 43:305-317.
 1957: With  E. H.  Y. Chu, "A study of primate chromosome complements". Am. Nat. 91:273-282.
 1958: With M. E. Case, "Evidence from tetrad analyses for both normal and aberrant recombination between allelic mutants in  Neurospora crassa". Proc. Natl. Acad. Sci. U. S. A. 44:378-390.

Footnotes

References
 Biographical Memoirs: V. 91, the National Academies Press, Washington, D.C., 2009, pp. 136–151. (also available at http://www.genetics.uga.edu/pdf/giles_NAS_obit.pdf )

American geneticists
1915 births
2006 deaths
Members of the United States National Academy of Sciences
Harvard University alumni
Emory University alumni
American microbiologists
Yale University faculty
University of Georgia faculty